The 2016 Qatar Open (also known as 2016 Qatar ExxonMobil Open for sponsorship reasons) was a men's tennis tournament played on outdoor hard courts. It was the 24th edition of the Qatar Open, and part of the ATP World Tour 250 series of the 2016 ATP World Tour. It took place at the Khalifa International Tennis and Squash Complex in Doha, Qatar, from January 4–9.

Points and prize money

Point distribution

Prize money

Singles main-draw entrants

Seeds

1 Rankings as of December 28, 2015

Other entrants
The following players received wildcards into the singles main draw:
  Marsel İlhan
  Malek Jaziri
  Mubarak Shannan Zayid

The following players received entry from the qualifying draw:
  Benjamin Becker
  Dustin Brown
  Kyle Edmund
  Aslan Karatsev

Withdrawals
Before the tournament
  Steve Darcis → replaced by  Marco Cecchinato
  Richard Gasquet (back injury) → replaced by  Paul-Henri Mathieu
  Guido Pella → replaced by  Illya Marchenko

Doubles main-draw entrants

Seeds

1 Rankings as of December 28, 2015

Other entrants
The following pairs received wildcards into the doubles main draw:
  Jabor Mohammed Ali Mutawa /  Malek Jaziri
  Mousa Shanan Zayed /  Mubarak Shannan Zayid

Champions

Singles 

  Novak Djokovic def.  Rafael Nadal, 6–1, 6–2

Doubles 

   Feliciano López /  Marc López def.  Philipp Petzschner /  Alexander Peya, 6–4, 6–3

External links